Rip Off Britain is a BBC One series which exposes Britain's rip-offs and helps consumers. It began on 30 November 2009, presented by former news journalists Angela Rippon, Gloria Hunniford and Jennie Bond. Newsreader Julia Somerville replaced Bond from series three. It has two spin-off series, Rip Off Britain Food and Rip Off Britain: Holidays. Rip Off Britain Live is shown for a week twice a year.

Format
The presenters investigate viewers' stories of being ripped-off, expose some of the rip-offs, and seek answers and, where appropriate, refunds or compensation. Numerous consumer experts advise consumers on their rights in short films within the programmes and at "Pop Ups" around the country. Experts include Simon Calder, David McClelland, Kate Hardcastle, Sylvia Rook, Helen Dewdney, Adam French, Gary Rycroft, Sarah Pennels, Paul Lewis and Martyn James.

Transmissions

Daytime

Primetime

Holidays

Food

Live

References

External links

{{cite web |title=The Cultural Logic of the 'Money Saving Expert''' |url=http://newsocialist.org.uk/martin-lewis-and-secondary-forms-exploitation/ |website=New Socialist}} A critique of "money saving experts", citing Rip Off Britain'' as an example.

2009 British television series debuts
2010s British television series
2020s British television series
BBC high definition shows
BBC Television shows
Television series by BBC Studios
Business-related television series in the United Kingdom
Consumer protection in the United Kingdom
Consumer protection television series
English-language television shows